Asimov's Science Fiction: 30th Anniversary Anthology (2007) is a science fiction anthology edited by Sheila Williams, the editor of Asimov's Science Fiction, of short stories that were all originally published in Asimov's. The book includes a five-page introduction by Williams, in which she briefly reviews the history of the magazine and clarifies that the book is merely a sampling from the magazine's history, not an attempt at a "best of", because that would have to run to many volumes. The book includes seventeen short stories, and a nine-page set of brief author biographies at the end.

The stories are as follows, with dates of original publication in Asimov's:

2007 non-fiction books
Science fiction anthologies
Books with cover art by Michael Whelan
Tachyon Publications books